Cascade in Atlanta may refer to:
Southwest Atlanta
Cascade Heights, a neighborhood in Southwest Atlanta